Nasser, older name is Bush is a city and corresponding markaz in Beni Suef Governorate, Egypt. It is named after former Egyptian President Gamal Abdel Nasser.

The city was called Pois in Ptolemaic and Byzantine Egypt.

The 1885 Census of Egypt recorded Bush (as Boche) as a nahiyah under the district of Beni Suef in Beni Suef Governorate; at that time, the population of the city was 7,091 (3,554 men and 3,537 women).

Demographics 

As of 2019, the estimated population of Nasser markaz was 393,002, of whom 264,887 lived in rural areas and 128,115 in urban areas.

References

Populated places in Beni Suef Governorate